The Lauterecken Formation is a geologic formation in Germany. It preserves fossils dating back to the Permian period.

See also 
 List of fossiliferous stratigraphic units in Germany

References

External links 
 

Geologic formations of Germany
Permian Germany
Paleontology in Germany